Katalin Borka (born 27 January 1952) is a Hungarian former professional tennis player.

Borka was named Hungarian Female Player of the Year in 1969 and made her only career Federation Cup appearance that year, against Canada in Athens.

A regular French Open participant in the early 1970s, Borka was Hungary's 1972 national singles champion and won a further two national titles in doubles. She represented Ú. Dózsa SC domestically.

See also
List of Hungary Federation Cup team representatives

References

External links
 
 

1952 births
Living people
Hungarian female tennis players